Hippocalcin like 4, also known as HPCAL4, is a human gene.

Function 

The protein encoded by this gene is highly similar to human hippocalcin protein and hippocalcin like-1 protein. It also has similarity to rat neural visinin-like Ca2+-binding protein-type 1 and 2 proteins. It is a member of the neuronal calcium sensor family. This encoded protein may be involved in the calcium-dependent regulation of rhodopsin phosphorylation. The transcript of this gene has multiple polyadenylation sites.

References

Further reading 

 
 
 
 
 

EF-hand-containing proteins